The 2022 Arnold Strongman Classic was a strongman contest that took place in Ohio, Columbus from 4–5 March 2022 at the Greater Columbus Convention Center. The Arnold Strongman Classic is seen as one of the biggest and most prestigious strongmen events on the circuit. This year marked the return of the competition after the 2021 edition was canceled due to the COVID-19 pandemic.

Martins Licis won the competition for the first time (becoming only the fourth man to win the Arnold Strongman Classic and the World's Strongest Man competitions after Savickas, Shaw and Björnsson), with Oleksii Novikov finishing in second place, and Luke Stoltman and Bobby Thompson finishing joint third place.

Qualifying

Due to the COVID-19 pandemic preventing any qualifying event from the Arnold Strongman Tour in 2020 and 2021, this edition had an invitiational system where athletes were invited based on past achievements in the sport. Athletes that qualified and their method for qualification are as follows:

Event results for

Event 1: Double T Squat
Notes: 3 lifts per athlete, weights to be submitted before each round.

Event 2: Monster Dumbell Press
Weight:  for max repetitions.
Time Limit: 90 seconds

Event 3: Austrian Oak
Notes: 3 lifts per athlete, weights to be submitted before each round.

^ JF Caron sustained an injury in this event and took no further part in the competition.

Event 4: Timber Carry
 Weight: 
 Course Length:  ramp
 Time Limit: 30 seconds
 Notes: No straps are allowed. Fastest time wins, then distance.

Event 5: Stone to Shoulder
Weight:  For max repetitions.
Time Limit: 2 Minutes 30 seconds.
Notes: Athletes were awarded points for getting the stone to their lap or torso but not completing the full repetition.

Final standings

References 

Arnold Strongman Classic
Arnold Strongman Classic
Arnold Strongman Classic
Strongmen competitions